Cal Paul Quantrill (born February 10, 1995) is a Canadian professional baseball pitcher for the Cleveland Guardians of Major League Baseball (MLB). He played college baseball for Stanford University. He was selected in the first round of the 2016 Major League Baseball draft by the San Diego Padres. He made his MLB debut in 2019. He previously played for the Padres.

Amateur career
Quantrill was a four-time varsity letterman in baseball at Trinity College School in Port Hope, Ontario, and also lettered in hockey and volleyball. He was drafted by the New York Yankees in the 26th round of the 2013 Major League Baseball draft, but did not sign. 

He chose to attend Stanford University. In his freshman season, he made 17 starts for Stanford, including their game on opening day, becoming the first freshman to start opening day for Stanford since Mike Mussina in 1988. Quantrill pitched to a 7–5 win–loss record, 2.68 earned run average (ERA), and 98 strikeouts in 110 innings pitched. In his sophomore year, Quantrill posted a 2–0 record and 1.93 ERA in 18 innings pitched before his season was cut short by an arm injury. He underwent Tommy John surgery and missed the remainder of the season and the entire 2016 season recovering.

Professional career

San Diego Padres
Heading into the 2016 Major League Baseball draft, Quantrill was ranked as one of the top available players by MLB. He was selected by the San Diego Padres with the eighth overall selection. The Padres signed Quantrill, and assigned him to the Arizona Padres. They promoted him to the Tri-City Dust Devils in August, and then to the Fort Wayne TinCaps later in the month. He finished the 2016 season with a combined 0–5 record and a 5.11 ERA in 12 starts between the three teams. After the season, Quantrill pitched in the San Diego Padres Futures Game, where he pitched two innings, striking out four.

Quantrill spent 2017 with both the San Antonio Missions and the Lake Elsinore Storm where he posted a combined 7–10 record with a 3.80 ERA in 22 games started between both teams. He began 2018 with San Antonio. On August 6, Quantrill started with the El Paso Chihuahuas the Triple-A affiliate for the Padres. In 28 total starts between San Antonio and El Paso, he was 9–6 with a 4.80 ERA and a 1.47 WHIP. He began 2019 back with El Paso.

Quantrill made his major league debut with the Padres on May 1, 2019, allowing two runs over  innings pitched. He recorded his first major league win in Toronto on May 25. He was optioned to the El Paso Chihuahuas on May 26. On the 2020 season for the Padres, Quantrill was 2-0 in 10 appearances.

Cleveland Indians / Guardians
On August 31, 2020, the Padres traded Quantrill, along with Austin Hedges, Josh Naylor, and minor league players Gabriel Arias, Owen Miller, and Joey Cantillo to the Cleveland Indians for Mike Clevinger, Greg Allen, and Matt Waldron.

With the 2020 Cleveland Indians, Quantrill appeared in 8 games, compiling a 0–0 record with 1.84 ERA and 13 strikeouts in  innings pitched.

In 2022 he was 15-5 with a 3.38 ERA in 186.1 innings, with a 1.208 WHIP.

On January 13, 2023, Quantrill agreed to a one-year, $5.55 million contract with the Guardians, avoiding salary arbitration.

Personal life
Quantrill's father, Paul, played 14 seasons in Major League Baseball.

References

External links

Stanford Cardinal bio

1995 births
Living people
Arizona League Padres players
Baseball players from Toronto
Canadian expatriate baseball players in the United States
Cleveland Guardians players
Cleveland Indians players
El Paso Chihuahuas players
Fort Wayne TinCaps players
Lake Elsinore Storm players
Major League Baseball pitchers
Major League Baseball players from Canada
People from Northumberland County, Ontario
San Antonio Missions players
San Diego Padres players
Stanford Cardinal baseball players
Tri-City Dust Devils players
2023 World Baseball Classic players